Urnyak (Ürnäk) is a rural locality (a village) in Mayadykovsky Selsoviet, Birsky District, Bashkortostan, Russia. The population was 19 as of 2010. There is 1 street.

Geography 
Urnyak is located 34 km southwest of Birsk (the district's administrative centre) by road. Akkainovo is the nearest rural locality.

References 

Rural localities in Birsky District